Justo Mullor García (8 May 1932 – 30 December 2016) was a Spanish prelate of the Catholic Church who spent his career in the diplomatic service of the Holy See and then headed the Vatican's academy for training diplomats.

Biography
Born in los Villares, Jaén, Spain, on 8 May 1932, Justo Mullor García was ordained to the priesthood on 8 December 1954. He entered the diplomatic service of the Holy See and on 21 March 1979 was named titular archbishop of Bolsena. On 22 March 1979, he was named Apostolic Nuncio to the Ivory Coast, on 2 May Apostolic Pro-Nuncio to Upper Volta, and on 25 August Apostolic Pro-Nuncio to Niger. He was later permanent observer of the Holy See to the European Council, permanent observer of the Holy See to the Office of the United Nations Organization in Geneva, and Estonia, Lithuania, Latvia, and Mexico.

He was the Apostolic Nuncio to Mexico when Pope John Paul II appointed him President of the Pontifical Ecclesiastical Academy on 11 February 2000.

Pope John Paul II named him a Consultor to the Secretariat of State on 4 July 2000. He also named him a participant in the 2001 Synod of Bishops.

Pope Benedict XVI accepted his resignation as President of the Ecclesiastical Academy on 13 October 2007.

Pope Benedict named him a member of the Congregation for the Causes of Saints on 22 April 2009.

He died in Rome on 30 December 2016. His remains were interred in the Cathedral of the Incarnation in Almería.

References

External links
 Catholic Hierarchy: Justo Mullor Garcia 

1932 births
2016 deaths
Spanish Roman Catholic priests
Apostolic Nuncios to Ivory Coast
Apostolic Nuncios to Burkina Faso
Apostolic Nuncios to Niger
Apostolic Nuncios to Estonia
Apostolic Nuncios to Latvia
Apostolic Nuncios to Lithuania
Apostolic Nuncios to Mexico
20th-century Roman Catholic titular archbishops